Acadia is the region of northeastern North America which was established as a French colony in the 17th century, today comprising roughly the Canadian provinces of Nova Scotia, New Brunswick, Prince Edward Island, the Gaspé region of Quebec; and parts of the U.S. state of Maine.

Acadia may also refer to:

Places

Canada
 Municipal District of Acadia No. 34, Alberta
 Acadia (electoral district), former district, Alberta
 Acadie (electoral district), former district in Montreal, Quebec 
 Acadia (region)
 Acadia River, tributary of the Richelieu River, Quebec
 Acadia University, in Wolfville, Nova Scotia

Pitcairn Islands
 Acadia Islet, part of the Ducie Island atoll, Pitcairn Islands (British Overseas Territory), in the Pacific Ocean

United States
 Acadia National Park, in Maine
 Acadia Parish, Louisiana, established 1886
 A proposed partition of northern Maine; see

Biology
 Acadia (genus), a genus in the Mycetophilidae family of fungus gnats described by Vockeroth in 1980

Transport
 CSS Acadia, a museum ship in Halifax, Nova Scotia
 USAHS Acadia, SS Acadia (1932) converted to Army hospital ship 1941 
 USS Acadia (AD-42), Yellowstone-class destroyer tender
 GMC Acadia, a 2007 crossover sport-utility vehicle (SUV)

Other uses
 ACADIA, a non-profit organization active in the area of computer-aided architectural design
 Acadia, a Stop & Shop brand of spring water products
 Acadia Pharmaceuticals
 Acadia (technical partnership), a joint venture in storage between Cisco, EMC, VMWare and Intel
 Acadia trees in RuneScape, an intentional misspelling of Acacia

See also
 Acadiana
 Acadian (disambiguation)
 Acadie (disambiguation)
 Accadia, a town in Apulia, Italy
 Akadia (disambiguation)
 Akkadian (disambiguation)
 Arcadia (disambiguation)
 Cascadia (disambiguation)